Wycombe Wanderers Football Club is an English association football club, based in the town of High Wycombe, Buckinghamshire. The club was founded in 1887, and competes in League One during the 2021–22 season.

For the first 82 years of their existence, Wycombe Wanderers didn't employ a manager, with the team being selected by the captain at the time. James McCormack was the first coach to be appointed in 1951 but it wasn't until Brian Lee took the reins in 1969 that the club had a recognised manager.

Following the sacking of Gary Waddock, Gareth Ainsworth was appointed as Wycombe Wanderers's caretaker-manager on 24 September 2012. Since 2013, he has been Wycombe's permanent manager.

Managers
Names of caretaker managers are supplied where known, and periods of caretaker-management are highlighted in italics. Win percentage is rounded to one decimal place. Statistics are correct as of 21 May 2022.

Key

M: Matches played
W: Matches won
D: Matches drawn
L: Matches lost

Footnotes

A.  By the 1973–74 season, the Isthmian League had split into two divisions: Division One and Division Two.
B.  By the 1977–78 season, the Isthmian League had split into three divisions: Premier Division, Division One and Division Two.

References
General
Club honours sourced from: List of Wycombe Wanderers F.C. seasons and Wycombe Wanderers F.C. § Honours

Specific

Managers
 
Wycombe Wanderers